In medicine, a peripheral venous catheter, peripheral venous line, peripheral venous access catheter, or peripheral intravenous catheter, is a catheter (small, flexible tube) placed into a peripheral vein for venous access to administer intravenous therapy such as medication fluids.

Use 
The catheter is introduced into the vein by a needle (similar to blood drawing), which is subsequently removed while the small plastic cannula remains in place. The catheter is then fixed by taping it to the patient's skin or using an adhesive dressing.

A peripheral venous catheter is the most commonly used vascular access in medicine. It is given to most emergency department and surgical patients, and before some radiological imaging techniques using radiocontrast, for example. In the United States, in the 1990s, more than 25 million patients had a peripheral venous line each year.

A peripheral venous catheter is usually placed in a vein on the hand or arm. It should be distinguished from a central venous catheter which is inserted in a central vein (usually in the internal jugular vein of the neck or the subclavian vein of the chest), or an arterial catheter which can be placed in a peripheral or central artery. In children, a topical anaesthetic gel (such as lidocaine) may be applied to the insertion site to facilitate placement.

Blood sampling can be carried out at the time of insertion of a peripheral venous catheter or at a later time.

Peripheral venous catheters may also be used in the emergency treatment of a tension pneumothorax- they can be placed in the second intercostal space along the mid clavicular line in order to relieve tension before definitive management with a chest drain.

Complications 
Infection, phlebitis, extravasation, infiltration, air embolism, hemorrhage (bleeding) and formation of a hematoma (bruise) may occur. A catheter embolism may occur when a small part of the cannula breaks off and flows into the vascular system. When removing a peripheral IV cannula, the tip should be inspected to ensure it's intact.

Because of the risk of insertion-site infection the CDC advises in their guideline that the catheter needs to be replaced every 96 hours. However, the need to replace these catheters routinely is debated.
Expert management has been shown to reduce the complications of peripheral lines.

It is not clear whether any dressing or securement device is better than the other on reducing the rates of catheter failures.

Sizes
Sizes of peripheral venous catheters can be given by Birmingham gauge or French gauge. Diameter is proportional to French gauge and inversely proportional to Birmingham gauge.

History 
The insertion of a plastic cannula and withdrawal of the needle was introduced as a technique in 1945. The first disposable version to be marketed was the Angiocath, first sold in 1964. In the 1970s and 1980s, the use of plastic cannulas became routine, and their insertion was more frequently delegated to nursing staff.

Newer catheters have been equipped with additional safety features to avoid needlestick injuries. Modern catheters consist of synthetic polymers such as teflon (hence the often used term 'Venflon' or 'Cathlon' for these venous catheters). In 1950 they consisted of polyvinyl chloride. In 1983, the first polyurethane version was introduced.

Additional images

References

External links
 National Cancer Institute: peripheral venous catheter
 Recommended practices for the insertion and management of peripheral intravenous catheters

Catheters